John Matthew Gerak (born January 6, 1970) is a former professional American football player who played guard for five seasons for the Minnesota Vikings and the St. Louis Rams.

1970 births
Living people
Players of American football from Youngstown, Ohio
American football offensive guards
Penn State Nittany Lions football players
Minnesota Vikings players
St. Louis Rams players